Bradley Allen Klippert (born June 27, 1957) is an American politician, minister, law enforcement officer, and military officer who formerly served as a member of the Washington House of Representatives from the 8th Legislative District.

Career
Klippert is a Pentecostal minister and a sheriff's deputy for the Benton County sheriff's department, serving as a school officer during legislative sessions and a patrol officer at other times. Klippert was a member of the United States Army Reserve in 1987 and retired from the Army National Guard as a lieutenant colonel in May 2016. In August 2016, Klippert was appointed as the commander of the Washington State Guard,  a position that he was directed to retire from in December, 2021.

Klippert was elected to the Washington House of Representatives in 2008 and was re-elected that year and again in 2010. He is currently an Assistant Minority Whip.

In January 2021, Klippert proposed legislation (House Bill 1377) that would end voting by mail in Washington state, stating that he has a "reasonable suspicion" that voter fraud using the system is widespread. The bill didn't pass through the House committee by the February deadline. Klippert stated he would continue to attempt to end the state's voting by mail system.

In August 2021, Klippert visited South Dakota to attend a symposium organized by MyPillow CEO Mike Lindell, known for actively promoting false claims of fraud in the 2020 presidential election. Klippert and other state Republican lawmakers joined in announcing the creation of an “election integrity caucus” seeking to conduct audits similar to the controversial Arizona audit in all states. He was one of three Washington legislators to attend the event using reimbursed funds from the state legislature's annual travel allotment for events "connected to their legislative work".

In November 2021, Klippert and 2 other Washington state Republican lawmakers signed a letter calling the 2020 election "corrupted" and demanded that an audit similar to the Arizona one be conducted in all states. The letter also requested the decertification of state electors from 2020 and falsely claimed that the Arizona audit found evidence of fraud.

In order to run for Congress, Klippert could not seek re-election for his legislative seat. Preliminary results from the August 2 non-partisan primary indicate that Stephanie Barnard and Patrick Guettner, both Republicans, will compete to succeed him in the November general election.

Elections

2004 U.S. Senate election

Klippert ran for the Republican nomination for the U.S. Senate seat of Patty Murray. He lost the primary to U.S. Representative George Nethercutt 432,748–29,870. Murray was re-elected at the general election.

2006 U.S. Senate election

Klippert ran in the Republican primary against former insurance corporation CEO Mike McGavick for the Senate seat held by Democrat Maria Cantwell. He came in distant second place, with seven percent of the vote against McGavick's 85 percent. Cantwell went on to win the general election.

2022 U.S. House election

Following Representative Dan Newhouse's vote to impeach President Donald Trump, Klippert announced his candidacy to challenge Newhouse in Washington's 4th congressional district. He lost in the primary, placing 5th among a field of 8 candidates.

Awards 
 2014 Guardians of Small Business award. Presented by NFIB.
 2020 Guardians of Small Business. Presented by NFIB.

References

External links
 Ballotpedia page
 Vote Smart page

1957 births
21st-century American politicians
American deputy sheriffs
American Pentecostals
Candidates in the 2022 United States House of Representatives elections
Living people
Republican Party members of the Washington House of Representatives
Washington National Guard personnel